Evju is a surname. Notable people with the surname include:

Erik Evju, Norwegian musician
Hans Oskar Evju (1886–1967), Norwegian politician 

Norwegian-language surnames